The European System of Accounts (ESA) is the system of national accounts and regional accounts used by members of the European Union. It was most recently updated in 2010 (ESA 2010).

The ESA 95 is fully consistent with the United Nations System of National Accounts (1993 SNA) in definitions, accounting rules and classifications. However, it incorporates certain differences, particularly in its presentation, that are more in line with use within the European Union. The ESA 95 underwent a revision to meet the requirements of the update of the SNA 1993 launched in 2003 under the auspices of the United Nations.

See also
Balance of payments
Capital account
Gross national income in the European Union
Gross output
Net output
Value added

References

Council Regulation (EC) No 2223/96 of 25 June 1996 on the European system of national and regional accounts in the Community, the annex contains the whole ESA95
European Commission (1996). "European System of Accounts ESA 1995" Eurostat, Brussels-Luxembourg,1996, xx + 383 pp.

National accounts